Southwest Florida is the region along the southwest Gulf coast of the U.S. state of Florida. The area is known for its beaches, subtropical landscape, and winter resort economy. 

Definitions of the region vary, though its boundaries are generally considered to put it south of the Tampa Bay area, west of Lake Okeechobee, and mostly north of the Everglades and to include Manatee, Sarasota, Charlotte, Lee, and Collier counties. For some purposes, the inland counties of DeSoto, Glades, and Hendry, and the thinly populated mainland section of Monroe County, south of Collier, are also included.

The region includes four metropolitan areas: the North Port-Bradenton-Sarasota MSA, the Cape Coral-Fort Myers MSA, the Naples-Marco Island MSA, and the Punta Gorda MSA. The most populous county in the region is Lee County (760,822 population), and the region's largest city is Cape Coral with a population of 194,016 as of 2020.

Development

With no large cities in its early history, Southwest Florida was largely ignored by commercial developers until the late 19th century. As a result, the region lacks the heavier development present in other parts of Florida. In recent years however, there has been a major real estate boom focusing on downtown Fort Myers (high-rise residential condominiums); southern Lee County (commercial development and high-technology); eastern Collier County (residential development); and eastern parts of Bradenton. Numerous efforts in recent years have been made to reduce development and preserve open space and recreational areas.

Inland counties (DeSoto, Hendry and Glades Counties) are notably rural, with the primary economic driver being agriculture.  Important products grown in this area include tomatoes, beef, sugarcane, and citrus products including oranges.  Agricultural harvesting in Southwest Florida employs approximately 16,000 seasonal workers, 90 percent of which are thought to be migrants.

Government
Each county in the region has its own county government.  Within each county, there are also self-governing cities, towns and villages.  The remaining majority of land in each county is controlled directly by the county government.  It is also very common for incorporated municipalities to contract county services in order to save costs and avoid redundancy. The region is designated as one of Florida's 4 districts for the Committee of Southern Historic Preservation (C-SHP). The district has been represented by Tommy Stolly since 2013.

Regional Transportation

Highways
Southwest Florida is served by several major highways, including the Tamiami Trail (U.S. 41) and the Interstate 75 freeway, both of which connect the area to Tampa to the north, and Greater Miami–Ft. Lauderdale to the east.  Long-term cooperative infrastructure planning is coordinated by the Southwest Florida Regional Planning Council (web site), and in heavily populated Lee County, the Metropolitan Planning Organization.

Greyhound Lines serves several locations in Southwest Florida, including Bradenton, Fort Myers, Naples, Port Charlotte, Punta Gorda and Sarasota.

Airports
Southwest Florida International Airport, located to the south of Fort Myers, is the area's primary airport for commercial traffic, serving 10.3 million passengers in 2021 and becoming one of the 50 busiest airports in the United States. Since 2022, the Lufthansa subsidiary Eurowings Discover operates a direct route between Fort Myers and Frankfurt Airport, the sole nonstop flight to Europe in the region; the airport also facilitates travel between 28 states as well as the Canadian provinces of Quebec and Ontario and Havana.

Sarasota–Bradenton International Airport serves as the secondary airport for the region and the primary airport for American and Canadian travelers hoping to travel to the northern part of Southwest Florida, flying as far west as Denver, as far north as Toronto Pearson and Minneapolis, and as far east as Boston. In 2021, the airport served 3.16 million passengers, a new record for the airport.

General aviation airports sprawl across the region, with the airport in Naples being the twelfth busiest in the nation for private jet traffic. The region also hosts general aviation facilities at namesake airports in various locations including Immokalee, Buckingham, LaBelle, Arcadia, Marco Island, Punta Gorda, and Venice, as well as at Fort Myers' Page Field, Placida's Coral Creek Airport, Everglades Airpark near Everglades City, and the Dade-Collier Training and Transition Airport straddling the line between Southwest Florida and the Miami metropolitan area.

Seaport
SeaPort Manatee provides a full range of port services for commercial, industrial and cruise ship purposes.

Railway
Seminole Gulf Railway provides freight services throughout Southwest Florida. The Atlantic Coast Line, Seaboard Air Line, and the Florida East Coast provide Florida with an intriguing history since most of the South's classic lines are operated here.

Tourism
Tourism is a major economic driver in the area. The warm winter climate draws tourists from across the United States, Canada, and Europe. Small towns as well as cultural centres, sea-captains hangouts and small industrial centres, Southwest Florida has more than 25 major tourist meccas. Southwest Florida is a region with a comfortable mixture of Florida's classic and cosmopolitan, relaxed and fast-paced. A place for everyone.

Major attractions/destinations:
Beaches in the following locales:
Bonita Beach
Cape Romano
Fort Myers Beach
Longboat Key, offshore from Bradenton and Sarasota
Marco Island, offshore from Naples
Naples
Sarasota
Sarasota Jungle Gardens in Sarasota
Sanibel and Captiva Islands, offshore from Fort Myers and Cape Coral
St. Armands Circle on St. Armands Key
Venice

Attractions including:
Edison and Ford Winter Estates in Fort Myers
Lake Okeechobee renowned for fishing and ecotourism.
Naples Botanical Garden
Naples Zoo at Caribbean Gardens
Brighton Seminole Indian Reservation where the Seminole nation operates a sizable casino.
Ringling Museum of Art in Sarasota
St. Armand's Circle in Sarasota

Education

Florida Gulf Coast University (FGCU) is a public university located just south of the Southwest Florida International Airport in South Fort Myers in Lee County, Florida. The university belongs to the 12-campus State University System of Florida. FGCU competes in the ASUN Conference in NCAA Division I sports. FGCU is accredited by the Commission on Colleges of the Southern Association of Colleges and Schools to award associate's, 51 different types of bachelor's, 29 different master's, and 6 types of doctoral degrees.

Sports
The following table shows the professional teams and major NCAA Division 1 teams that play in Southwest Florida.

Spring training
Florida is the traditional home for Major League Baseball spring training, with teams informally organized into the "Grapefruit League." , Southwest Florida hosts the following major league teams for spring training:

Atlanta Braves in North Port
Boston Red Sox in Fort Myers
Baltimore Orioles in Sarasota
Minnesota Twins in South Fort Myers
Pittsburgh Pirates in Bradenton
Tampa Bay Rays in Port Charlotte

Area codes
Area code 239 Collier and Lee counties (Portions of Hendry, Charlotte and Monroe counties)
Area code 941 Charlotte, Manatee and Sarasota Counties, and also includes Boca Grande, in Lee County
Area code 863 DeSoto, Hendry and Glades counties

Media

Newspapers
 The Banner
 The Bradenton Herald
 Breeze Newspapers
 Florida Weekly
 Naples Daily News
 The News-Press
 Sarasota Herald-Tribune
 Southwest Florida Business Today
 The Sun

Television and radio stations

Counties

Major incorporated cities
Bradenton, Manatee County
Bonita Springs, Lee County
Cape Coral, Lee County
Fort Myers, Lee County
Naples, Collier County
North Port, Sarasota County
Sarasota, Sarasota County
Punta Gorda, Charlotte County

Major unincorporated communities
Communities listed have a population greater than 30,000 according to the 2000 census.
Lehigh Acres, Lee County
North Fort Myers, Lee County
Port Charlotte, Charlotte County
South Fort Myers, Lee County

See also

 Florida Suncoast
 Conservancy of Southwest Florida
 Southwest Florida College
 Southwest Florida International Airport

References

External links

Lee County, Florida
Collier County, Florida
Charlotte County, Florida
Sarasota County, Florida
DeSoto County, Florida
Glades County, Florida
Hendry County, Florida
Manatee County, Florida
Regions of Florida
South Florida